Teet Jagomägi (born 27 September 1969 in Tartu) is an Estonian politician. He was a member of X Riigikogu. He has been a member of Res Publica Party.

References

Living people
1969 births
Res Publica Party politicians
Members of the Riigikogu, 2003–2007
University of Tartu alumni
Politicians from Tartu